HVHS may refer to:

 Harbour View High School, in Saint John, New Brunswick, Canada
 Hidden Valley High School (Grants Pass, Oregon), United States
 Hidden Valley High School (Virginia), in Roanoke, Virginia, United States
 Hoosac Valley High School, in Cheshire, Massachusetts, United States
 Hutt Valley High School, in Lower Hutt, New Zealand